Andrey Nikolayevich Malakhov (born 11 January 1972) is a Russian television personality and presenter on the main Russian television channel, Russia-1.

Biography
Born on 11 January 1972 in Apatity, (Murmansk Oblast), studied violin at music school. 

In 1995 he graduated from the Faculty of Journalism of the Moscow State University, before studying for one and a half years at Michigan State University. During these studies worked on the newspaper Moskovskiye Novosti and broadcast the show Стиль (Style) on Radio Maximum.

He publishes a magazine and website of the same name, StarHit.

In 1998  entered the faculty of law of the Russian State University for the Humanities and since graduating has worked there, teaching the basics of journalism.

Career
Malakhov has hosted the talk show Let Them Talk from July 2001 to 2017.

In May 2009, Malakhov presented the semifinals of the 2009 Eurovision Song Contest with the Russian model Natalia Vodianova.

Television

1992: worked at The Sunday with Sergey Alekseev
1995: editor of the international informational program Morning and the presenter of the show  Style
1996–2001: the show Good Morning on Channel One
2001–2004: talk show The Big Washing
2004–2007: the music show Golden Gramophone
2004–2005: talk show Five Evenings
2005–2017: talk show Lets Them Talk
April–May, 2006: the show about folk medicine Malakhov+Malakhov (together with his namesake Gennady Malakhov)
2005–2007: broadcast  Golden Gramophone on Russkoe Radio
2008: TV show  TV star - Superstar  on Ukrainian TV
2008: the show Two Stars, together with Masha Rasputina (as a participant)
2010–2011: the show Lie Detector
2012–2017: the Saturday talk show Tonight
 since 2017 TV show “Live with Andrey Malakhov”
 since 2017 the Saturday talk show “Hello, Andrey!”

Filmography
Malakhov made cameo appearances as himself in the following films:
2007: Kilometer Zero
2007: Indigo
2007: Happy Together
2009: Daddy's Daughters
2011: Exchange Wedding
2015: The Very Best Day
2019: Serf

Awards
 Medal of the Order "For Merit to the Fatherland" 2nd class (2006)

Personal life
In June 2011, Malakhov married  Natalia Shkuleva  (born 31 May 1980), a publisher of magazine Elle by Hearst Shkulev Digital (Russian edition). They married in the Palace of Versailles.
In August 2017, the couple announced that they are expecting their first child.

See also
 List of Eurovision Song Contest presenters

References

External links

1972 births
Living people
People from Apatity
Russian television presenters
Moscow State University alumni
Michigan State University alumni
Russian journalists
Russian State University for the Humanities alumni
Recipients of the Medal of the Order "For Merit to the Fatherland" II class
Russian magazine editors